Morecambe Harbour railway station was on the "little" North Western Railway's Morecambe Harbour and Railway in Morecambe, Lancashire, England. It was opened in 1848 and closed in 1904. The line remained open to serve the harbour until an unknown date. Today the station building still exists as a cafe.

References 
 
 

Disused railway stations in Lancaster
Former Midland Railway stations
Railway stations in Great Britain opened in 1848
Railway stations in Great Britain closed in 1904
Buildings and structures in Morecambe